Khabar Bharti is a Hindi language news channel in India, owned by the Sai Prakash Group, a business group from Madhya Pradesh.

References

24-hour television news channels in India